The 2013 Montreal Alouettes season was the 47th season for the team in the Canadian Football League and their 59th overall. The Alouettes finished in 3rd place in the East Division with an 8–10 record and struggled  to  make  the  playoffs  after losing Anthony Calvillo to a career ending concussion, but made the playoffs for an 18th straight season, but lost in the East Division Semi-Final to the Hamilton Tiger-Cats 19–16 in overtime.

Offseason

CFL draft
The 2013 CFL Draft took place on May 6, 2013. The Alouettes had nine selections in the seven-round draft, after acquiring additional first and fourth round selections for placekicker Brody McKnight.

Preseason 

 Games played with colour uniforms.

Regular season

Season Standings

Season Schedule 

 Games played with colour uniforms.
 Games played with white uniforms.
 Games played with alternate uniforms.

Playoffs

Schedule

 Game played with white uniforms.

East Semi-Final

Team

Roster

Coaching staff

References

Montreal Alouettes seasons
Mont